Taj Williams (born April 2, 1993) is an American football wide receiver who is currently a free agent. He played college football at TCU.

Professional career
Williams signed with the Seattle Seahawks as an undrafted free agent on May 4, 2018, but was waived following their rookie minicamp on May 7.

Williams signed with the Atlanta Falcons as an undrafted free agent on June 4, 2018. He was waived on August 20, 2018.

References

1993 births
Living people
American football wide receivers
TCU Horned Frogs football players
Atlanta Falcons players
Seattle Seahawks players